Saeed Al-Qarni (born 3 February 1989) is a Saudi Arabian professional footballer who plays as a midfielder for Saudi Professional League side Al-Ain.

Career
Al-Qarni started his career at the youth team of Al-Ain and represented the club at every level. On 21 July 2017, joined to Al-Hazem. On 20 July 2018, Al-Qarni joined Al-Ain, Al-Qarni achieved promotion with Al-Ain to the Pro League for the first time in the club's history.

References

External links
 

1989 births
Living people
Saudi Arabian footballers
Association football midfielders
Wej SC players
Al-Hazem F.C. players
Al-Ain FC (Saudi Arabia) players
Saudi Fourth Division players
Saudi Second Division players
Saudi First Division League players
Saudi Professional League players